Houria or Hourya is a given name of Arabic origin. It may refer to:

People

Houria
Houria Affak (born 1988), Algerian footballer
Houria Aïchi, Algerian Berber singer
Houria Niati (born 1948), Algerian artist

Hourya
Hourya Benis Sinaceur, Moroccan philosopher

Others
Al-Houriya, a weekly Arabic language newspaper in MauritaniaO Houria'', 2010 album of Souad Massi

See also
Houri
Houri (disambiguation)
Houry